Jane March Horwood (born 20 March 1973) is an English film actress and former model.

Early life and education
March was born Jane March Horwood in Edgware, London. Her father, Bernard Horwood, was a design and technology secondary school teacher of English and Spanish ancestry. Her mother, Jean, a newsagent, is Vietnamese and Chinese. March has one brother, a landscape designer.

At age 14, whilst still attending Nower Hill High School in Pinner, north London, March won a local "Become a Model" contest. She signed with Storm Model Management and began working as a print model using her middle name March, which was also her birth month.

Career
After GCSEs, March moved to an apartment in Wimbledon with friends and continued to model before a call to audition in Paris on her 17th birthday following a cover shoot of Just Seventeen which had attracted the attention of French director Jean-Jacques Annaud's wife, Laurence Duval Annaud.  March was chosen to play the female lead in 1992 film The Lover, based on a semi-autobiographical novel by Marguerite Duras.

Two years after The Lover, she co-starred with Bruce Willis in the erotic thriller Color of Night (1994), directed by Richard Rush. The script was the first March had received since The Lover. Color of Night became a box office failure, but the film went on to do very well in the home video market and became one of the top 20 most-rented films in the United States in 1995. Maxim magazine also ranked her sex scene in the film as "the Best Sex Scene in film history".

Personal life
While Color of Night was in production, March began dating the film's co-producer, Carmine Zozzora.  The couple married in June 1993 in an 11-minute ceremony at which Willis was the best man and Demi Moore was the maid of honour. According to Color of Night director Richard Rush, March still received many offers from Hollywood studios after the film's release, but Zozzora required the studios to also hire him as the producer for any film in which March would star, a condition most studios rejected. For this reason, March did not star in more films during their marriage. 

March and Zozzora separated in 1997 and finally divorced in 2001. A few years later, March married Steven Waddington; they have one child.

Filmography

Film

Television

References

External links
 
 

                   

Living people
1973 births
20th-century English actresses
21st-century English actresses
Actresses from London
British actresses of Asian descent
British actresses of Chinese descent
English film actresses
English television actresses
English people of Chinese descent
English people of Spanish descent
English people of Vietnamese descent
People from Edgware